M. gouldii may refer to:
 Mesembriomys gouldii, the black-footed tree-rat, an arboreal rat species
 Myobatrachus gouldii, the turtle frog, a frog species found in Western Australia

See also
 Gouldii (disambiguation)